Happy Family is a Japanese instrumental progressive rock band based in Tokyo formed in 1987 by music students of Tokyo's University of Meiji. They are influenced by  French progressive rock band Magma (and so are associated with Magma's style of music which is termed Zeuhl) and British experimental band Henry Cow, 

They are also influenced by minimal music. Jim Dorsch, writing for AllMusic, feels that the drummer, Nagase, contributes "rhythmic complexity" to their music. They broke up at the end of 1998 for 14 years, then reformed in 2012. They are now active, releasing new album along with attending 1st edition of Rock in Opposition Japan Festival in 2014.

History
 around 1st album
 Kenichi Morimoto (keyboards) / Tatsuya Miyano (bass) / Shige Makino (guitar) / Keiichi Nagase (drums)
 around 2nd album
 Kenichi Morimoto (keyboards) / Tatsuya Miyano (bass) / Takahiro Izutani (guitar) / Keiichi Nagase (drums)
 around 3rd album ~ now
 Kenichi Morimoto (keyboards) / Hidemi Ichikawa (bass) / Takahiro Izutani (guitar) / Keiichi Nagase (drums)

Discography
 Happy Family; Cuneiform Records, 1995
 Toscco; Cuneiform Records/ Arcangelo, 1997
 Minimal Gods; Cuneiform Records / Disk Union, 2014
 Various Artists / Unsettled Scores; Cuneiform Records, 1995

References

External links
 Takahiro Izutani
 Cuneiform Records

Japanese progressive rock groups